Ponzano may refer to:

Municipalities (comuni)
Ponzano di Fermo, in the Province of Fermo, Marche, Italy
Ponzano Monferrato, in the Province of Alessandria, Piedmont, Italy
Ponzano Romano, in the Province of Rome, Lazio, Italy
Ponzano Veneto, in the Province of Treviso, Veneto, Italy

Hamlets (frazioni)
Ponzano (Civitella del Tronto), in the municipality of Civitella del Tronto (TE), Abruzzo, Italy
Ponzano (Teramo), in the municipality of Teramo, Abruzzo, Italy
Ponzano Magra, in the municipality of Santo Stefano di Magra (SP), Liguria, Italy

 Ships
 SS Ponzano, sunk by mine in 1939